Robert Antonioli (born 23 December 1990) is an Italian ski mountaineer.

Antonioli was born in Sondalo, started ski mountaineering in 2004, and took part in his first competition race in 2006. He is member of the Sci Club Alta Valtellina, and lives in Valfurva.

Selected results 
 2010:
 1st (juniors), Trophée des Gastlosen (ISMF World Cup), together with Michele Boscacci
 2011:
 1st, World Championship relay, together with Manfred Reichegger, Denis Trento and Matteo Eydallin
 2nd, World Championship sprint
 3rd, World Championship vertical, total ranking
 9th, World Championship individual
 3rd, Trofeo Mezzalama, together with Marc Pinsach Rubirola and Michele Boscacci
 9th, Pierra Menta, together with Michele Boscacci
 2012:
 2nd, European Championship sprint
 3rd, European Championship relay, together with Matteo Eydallin, Damiano Lenzi and Manfred Reichegger
 7th, European Championship single
 8th, World Championship vertical, combined ranking

External links 
 Robert Antonioli at skimountaineering.org

References 

1990 births
Living people
Italian male ski mountaineers
World ski mountaineering champions
People from Sondrio
Sportspeople from the Province of Sondrio